Yucai School may refer to:

 Number Seven Yucai Middle School - Chengdu
 Chongqing Yucai Middle School
 Chengdu Yucai Middle School
 Guangzhou Yucai Middle School
 Hangzhou Yucai Middle School
 Jinan Yucai Middle School
 Jining Yucai Middle School
 Northeast Yucai School
 Qingdao Yucai Middle School
 Shanghai Yucai High School
 Shenzhen Yucai High School
 Xiamen Yucai Middle School